The following is a list of the Portugal national football team's competitive records and statistics.

Individual records

Player records

Most capped players

Players in bold are still active with Portugal.

Top goalscorers

Players in bold are still active for the national team.

Other records
Most matches played in World Cup  21 – Cristiano Ronaldo (2006, 2010, 2014, 2018 and 2022)
Most matches played in European Championship  25 – Cristiano Ronaldo (2004, 2008, 2012, 2016 and 2020)
Oldest player (outfield and goalkeeper) 39 years, 9 months and 10 days – Pepe (6–1 against Switzerland on 6 December 2022)
Longest national career 19 years, 3 months and 12 days  – Cristiano Ronaldo (from 20 August 2003 to 2 December 2022) 
Longest national career for an outfield player 19 years, 3 months and 16 days  – Cristiano Ronaldo (from 20 August 2003 to 6 December 2022) 
Youngest debutant 17 years, 6 months and 24 days – Paulo Futre (5–0 against Finland on 21 September 1983)
Youngest player to reach 100 caps 27 years, 8 months and 11 days – Cristiano Ronaldo (1–1 against Northern Ireland on 16 October 2012)

Manager records

Goal records
Most goals scored in one World Cup  9 – Eusébio (1966)
Most goals scored in World Cups  9 – Eusébio (1966)
Most goals scored in one European Championship  5 – Cristiano Ronaldo (2020)
Most goals scored in European Championships  14 – Cristiano Ronaldo (2004, 2008, 2012, 2016 and 2020)
Oldest goalscorer 39 years, 9 months and 10 days – Pepe (6–1 against Switzerland on 6 December 2022)
Youngest goalscorer 17 years, 9 months and 25 days – Fernando Chalana (2–1 against Cyprus on 5 December 1976)
Most hat-tricks 10 – Cristiano Ronaldo (includes four goals against Andorra on 7 October 2016 and Lithuania on 10 September 2019)
Most pokers 2 – Cristiano Ronaldo
Youngest player to score a hat-trick 20 years, 11 months and 4 days – André Silva (6–0 against Faroe Islands on 10 October 2016)

Competition records 

 Champions   Runners-up   Third place   Fourth place

FIFA World Cup

*Draws include knockout matches decided via penalty shoot-out.

UEFA European Championship

*Draws include knockout matches decided via penalty shoot-out. Red border colour indicates that the tournament was held on home soil.

UEFA Nations League

*Draws include knockout matches decided via penalty shoot-out.
**Group stage played home and away. Flag shown represents host nation for the finals stage. Red border colour indicates the finals stage will be held on home soil

FIFA Confederations Cup

*Draws include knockout matches decided via penalty shoot-out.

Olympic Games

1968–1988 national amateur football team. Football at the Summer Olympics has been an under-23 tournament since 1992.

*Draws include knockout matches decided via penalty shoot-out.

Minor tournaments*Draws include knockout matches decided via penalty shoot-out.

All-time results 

The following table shows Portugal's all-time international record, correct as of 29 March 2022.

Source: Portugal - Historical results

Head-to-head record 
Portugal national football team has played teams from every confederation. Their first international match was played on 18 December 1921 in Madrid against Spain, losing 3–1. The team they have played the most is Spain, with a total of 40 matches played. Their biggest win has been by 8 goals in three matches: against Liechtenstein in 1994 and 1999, and against Kuwait in 2003.

As of match against  on 6 December 2022.

All-time results 

The following table shows Portugal's all-time international record, correct as of 5 June 2022.

Source: Portugal - Historical results

Notes

References

Portugal national football team records and statistics
National association football team records and statistics